M-Net Literary Awards were a group of South African literary awards, awarded from 1991 to 2013. They were established and sponsored by M-Net (Electronic Media Network), a South African television station. The award was suspended indefinitely after the 2013 season. In the awards' fourth year, an award for indigenous African languages was inaugurated, alongside the original English and Afrikaans awards, to encourage writing in indigenous languages. In subsequent years there were six language categories, covering all eleven official South African languages: English; Afrikaans; Nguni (Zulu, Xhosa, Ndebele, and Swati); SeSotho (Sotho, Pedi, and Tswana); TshiVenda; and SeTsonga. In 2005, a Film award was introduced, for novels that novels that showed promise for translation into a visual medium. Three Lifetime Achievements Awards were also given: to Mazisi Kunene (2005), Cynthia Marivate (2006), and Mzilikazi Khumalo (2007). 

In their early years, the M-Net Awards were notable among South African literary awards for considering, under their judging criteria, not only literary merit but also "strong narrative content" and "accessibility to a broad reading public." They were also, in the 1990s, the best remunerated literary awards in South Africa. From 2011, winners received a prize of R50 000, up from R30,000 in previous years.  

Until 2010, the Awards were announced at the same event as the Via Afrika Awards (previously known as the Nasboek Literary Awards), which are ongoing as the Media24 Books Literary Awards.

Award winners

References

External links 
M-Net Literary Awards, African Book Awards Database, Indiana University
South African literary awards
Awards established in 1991
1991 establishments in South Africa
Fiction awards
South African literary events
Awards disestablished in 2013
2013 disestablishments in South Africa